Angelika Rösch (born 8 June 1977) is a retired female tennis player from Germany. She reached her career-high ranking in singles of No. 69 in the world on 24 February 2003, and retired from professional tennis in 2010.

Rösch turned professional in 1996 and spent several years in mostly ITF Women's Circuit events before enjoying her best year in 2002, reaching the top 100 and making her Grand Slam debut at Wimbledon. She also beat Elena Dementieva three times during that season, with Dementieva being ranked in the top 20 in all three of the meetings. She went on to play in all four Grand Slams during 2003, but failed to advance past the first round in any of them.

WTA career finals

Doubles: 1 runner-up

ITF finals

Singles (5–5)

Doubles (6–7)

External links
 
 

1977 births
Living people
German female tennis players
Tennis players from Berlin
People from East Berlin
20th-century German women